Motown Magic is an animated children's television series, created by Josh Wakely, and produced for Netflix. The series follows Ben, described by Netflix as “a wide-eyed 8-year-old with a big heart and an amazing imagination,” who uses a magic paintbrush to bring the street art in Motown to life. Wakely acquired worldwide rights from the music of Motown to feature in the series. The program features versions of songs by the popular record label, performed by contemporary recording artists and interwoven into the narrative. Motown hits that are recorded in the series are from such performers as The Jackson 5, Michael Jackson, The Temptations, Stevie Wonder, Marvin Gaye, The Supremes and Smokey Robinson & The Miracles.

The series was first made available worldwide on Netflix on November 20, 2018.

Cast and characters
 Avia Fields as Ben
 Marissa Buccianti as Ella
 Betsy Kenney as Angie
 Monie Mon as Mickey
 Alex Thomas as Brad, Jimmy Mack
 Steven Cantor as Dancing Machine
 Rhonda Morman as Grandma Ruby
 Ryan Robinson as Grandpa Marvin
 Byron Marc Newsome as Uncle Rod
 Kelly Jean Badgley as Jenny
 Ingrid Nilson as Harmony
 Autumn Joy as Bernadette
 Amanuel Richards as Bill
 Peter Tiganis as Johnny

Reception
Motown Magic received favourable reviews. Critics praised the concept of reimagining Motown songs for a young audience.

Other media

Soundtracks
The first soundtrack to the show was released on online music-streaming service Apple Music on November 20, 2018.

References

External links
 

2010s American animated television series
2010s American black cartoons
2018 American television series debuts
2019 American television series endings
American children's animated adventure television series
American children's animated musical television series
American children's animated fantasy television series
Animated television series about children
2010s Australian animated television series
2010s Australian black cartoons
2018 Australian television series debuts
2019 Australian television series endings
Television series by Beyond Television Productions
Australian children's animated adventure television series
Australian children's animated musical television series
Australian children's animated fantasy television series
Motown
Netflix children's programming
Animated television series by Netflix
English-language Netflix original programming